Qoca is a GPL library for incrementally solving systems of linear equations with various goal functions.  It contains a robust implementation of Cassowary, a popular linear programming algorithm for handling Manhattan goal functions.  It is used in several free software projects and is maintained at Monash University.  It is available in a C++ or a Java version, and provides language bindings for Python and Perl.

External links
 project page

The CVS host listed on the download page no longer exists.
The sources no longer compile out of the box (2013).
Perhaps this 2003 software is unmaintained today.

C (programming language) libraries
Java (programming language) libraries